Bodrogkisfalud is a village in Borsod-Abaúj-Zemplén county, Hungary. 

It was first mentioned under the name Kysfalud in a source dating to 1220. Its primary industry is viticulture. The current mayor, as of May 2021, is Sándor Balogh.

The village has a neo-Romanesque Roman Catholic church built in 1930, consecrated in honour of St Anne. There was no church building in the town until 1772, when the Jesuits consecrated a small chapel there. A full church was built in 1810, but by 1929 had reached such a state of disrepair that it had to be demolished, to be replaced by the current building.

It also features a bust of György Klapka by Gyula Alpár Veres, and a 1896 monument to the 1848/1849 Hungarian Revolution.

Bodrogkisfalud had a significant Jewish population from the 18th century until the Second World War, when it was deported by the Nazis; very few returned.

References

External links 
 Street map 

Populated places in Borsod-Abaúj-Zemplén County